Street Vendors (Protection of Livelihood and Regulation of Street Vending) Act, 2014 is an Act of the Parliament of India enacted to regulate street vendors in public areas and protect their rights. It was introduced in the Lok Sabha (Lower House of the Parliament of India) on 6 September 2012 by then Union Minister of Housing and Urban Poverty Alleviation,  Kumari Selja. The Bill was passed in the Lok Sabha on 6 September 2013 and by the Rajya Sabha (upper house) on 19 February 2014. The bill received the assent of the President of India on 4 March 2014. The Act came into force from 1 May 2014.

Street vendors in India

According to the Ministry of Housing and Urban Poverty Alleviation, there are 10 million street vendors in India, with Mumbai accounting for 250,000, Delhi has 450,000, Kolkata, more than 150,000, and Ahmedabad, 100,000. Most of them are immigrants or laid-off workers, work for an average 10–12 hours a day, and remain impoverished. In India, street vending makes up 14% of total (non-agricultural) urban informal employment. Though the prevalent license-permit raj in Indian bureaucracy ended for most retailing in the 1990s, it continues in this trade. Inappropriate license ceiling in most cities, like Mumbai which has a ceiling 14,000 licenses, means more vendors hawk their goods illegally, which also makes them prone to the bribery and extortion culture under local police and municipal authorities, besides harassment, heavy fines and sudden evictions. In Kolkata, the profession was a cognisable and non-bailable offense.

Over the years the street vendors have organized themselves into trade unions and associations, and numerous NGO's have started working for them. The National Hawker Federation  (NHF), based all over India, is a federation of 1400 street vendor organizations, trade unions in 28 states.

History
The bill aimed at providing social security and livelihood rights to street vendors, has its origins in the 'National Policy For Urban Street Vendors' introduced in 2004, which was later revised as 'National Policy on Urban Street Vendors' in 2009. Also in the same year, the Ministry of Housing and Urban Poverty Alleviation circulated a draft of bill titled, 'Model Street Vendors (Protection of Livelihood and Regulation of Street Vending) Bill, 2009', between all States and Union Territory governments for creation of state legislation, however it had no legal bindings, thus few governments made any progress in this regard. Eventually in 2010, the Supreme Court of India, which has  recognized street vending as a source of livelihood, directed the ministry to work out on a central legislation, and a draft of same was unveiled to the public on 11 November 2011. The key point of the draft bill were, protection of legitimate street vendors from harassment by police and civic authorities, and demarcation of "vending zones" on the basis of "traditional natural markets", proper representation of vendors and women in decision making bodies, and establishment of effective grievance redressal and dispute resolution mechanism.

The bill was drafted with the help of the National Advisory Council, chaired by Sonia Gandhi, and approved by the Union Cabinet on 17 August 2012. After the cabinet's approval it was introduced in the Lok Sabha (Lower House of the Parliament of India) on 6 September 2012 by the Union Minister of Housing and Urban Poverty Alleviation,  Kumari Selja, amidst the uproar over the coal block allocation scam in the house. The Bill was passed in the Loksabha on 6 September 2013 and by the Rajyasabha on 19 February 2014.

Content of the Bill
 
 Town Vending Committee will be responsible for conducting of survey of all the vendors under its jurisdiction, and such survey must be conducted every five years. No street vendor will be evicted until such survey has been made and a certificate of vending has been issued.
 All street vendors will be accommodated in a designated vending zone. In case, all the vendors cannot be accommodated in the same vending zone, allocation of space will be made by drawing of lots. However, those who fail to get space in the same vending zone, will be accommodated in adjoining vending zones.
 All street vendors above fourteen years of age will be granted a certificate of vending. However, such certificates will be granted only if the person gives an undertaking that he will carry out his business by himself or through the help of his family members, he has no other means of livelihood and he will not transfer the certificate. However, the certificate can be transferred to one of his family members if such vendor dies or suffers from permanent disability.
 The certificate may be cancelled if the vendor breaches the conditions of the certificate.
 No vendor will be allowed to carry out vending activities in no-vending zones.
 In case of declaration of a specified area as a no-vending zone, the vendors will be relocated to another area. However, such street vendors must be given a notice of at least 30 days for relocation. Vendors who fail to vacate such space after a notice has been given, will have to pay a penalty which may extend up to two hundred fifty rupees per day.
 The local authority may physically remove the vendor and make seizure of goods of such vendors who have not relocated to the vending zones.
 There shall be a dispute resolution body consisting of a Chairperson who has been a civil judge or a judicial magistrate and two other professionals as prescribed by the appropriate government.
 There will be a Town Vending Committee in each zone or ward of the local authority.
 A vendor who vends without a certificate of vending or a vendor who contravenes the conditions laid down in the certificate may be penalised with a fine which may extend up to two thousand rupees.

Shortcomings
The National Hawker Federation (NHF) has pointed out that the present bill differs from the draft bill, which ensured that 'Town Vending Committees' (TVC) would have at least 40 per cent representation of street vendors, however the final bill presented in the monsoon session of the Parliament, the civic bodies, which have no representation of street vendors, are made the final authority on all issues concerning their fate, including the rehabilitation and resettlement plans, plus the bill also have legal ambiguities, like no clear definition of "public purpose land", which makes its interpretation liable to misuse of the law.

According to Sharit Bhowmik, professor and chairperson of the Centre for Labour Studies at Tata Institute of Social Sciences, Mumbai, the bill leaves the onus of creating the schemes to the local municipalities of the states, "which defeats the purpose of a Central legislation."

References

External links
The Street Vendors (Protection Of Livelihood And Regulation Of Street Vending) Bill, 2012

 Sen R.K. and Gupta S. (2018). Economic Existence of Street Vendors and their Role in Urban Economy: A Cost Benefit Approach, 5, (2.6) 95-102

Retailing in India
Manmohan Singh administration
Acts of the Parliament of India 2014